The 2018 United States House of Representatives elections in Arkansas were held on Tuesday, November 6, 2018, to elect the four U.S. representatives from the U.S. state of Arkansas; one from each of the state's four congressional districts. Primaries were held on May 22, 2018. The elections and primaries coincided with the elections and primaries of other federal and state offices. Polls were open from 7:30 AM to 7:30 PM CST.

Overview

District
Results of the 2018 United States House of Representatives elections in Arkansas by district:

District 1

The incumbent is Republican Rick Crawford, who has represented the district since 2011. Crawford was re-elected with 76% of the vote in 2016. The Democratic nominee is Chintan Desai, a project manager for KIPP.

Democratic primary
 Chintan Desai, project manager for KIPP: Delta Public Schools and former Teach for America member

Republican primary
 Rick Crawford, incumbent

General election

Polling

Results

District 2

The incumbent is Republican French Hill, who has represented the district since 2015. He was re-elected with 58% of the vote in 2016. The Democratic nominee is Clarke Tucker, a state representative.

Arkansas's 2nd district has been included on the initial list of Republican held seats being targeted by the Democratic Congressional Campaign Committee in 2018.

Democratic primary
 Gwendolynn Millen Combs, teacher and businesswoman
 Jonathan Dunkley
 Paul Spencer, teacher and activist 
Clarke Tucker, member of the Arkansas House of Representatives

Primary results

Republican primary
 French Hill, Incumbent

General election

Polling

Results

District 3

The incumbent is Republican Steve Womack, who has represented the district since 2011. He was re-elected with 77% of the vote in 2016. The Democratic nominee is Joshua Mahony from Fayetteville, Arkansas. The Libertarian candidate is Michael Kalagias, a retired teacher and volunteer firefighter from Rogers, Arkansas.

Democratic primary
 Joshua Mahony, president of the Arkansas Single Parent Scholarship Fund and former chairman of the Fayetteville Airport Commission.

Republican primary
 Robb Ryerse, pastor and a "progressive Republican" 
 Steve Womack, Incumbent

Primary results

General election

Polling

Results

District 4

The incumbent is Republican Bruce Westerman, who has represented the district since 2015. He was re-elected with 75% of the vote in 2016. The Democratic nominee is Hayden Shamel, a teacher from Hot Springs, Arkansas.

Democratic primary
 Hayden Shamel, Teacher

Republican primary
 Randy Caldwell, preacher
 Bruce Westerman, Incumbent

Primary results

General election

Polling

Results

References

External links
Candidates at Vote Smart 
Candidates at Ballotpedia 
Campaign finance at FEC 
Campaign finance at OpenSecrets

Official campaign websites for first district candidates
Chintan Desai (D) for Congress
Rick Crawford (R) for Congress

Official campaign websites for second district candidates
Clarke Tucker (D) for Congress
French Hill (R) for Congress

Official campaign websites for third district candidates
Joshua Mahony (D) for Congress
Steve Womack (R) for Congress

Official campaign websites for fourth district candidates
Hayden Shamel (D) for Congress
Bruce Westerman (R) for Congress

Arkansas
2018
United States House of Representatives